Yury Petrovich Trutnev (born 1 March 1956) is a Russian politician who serves as a Deputy Prime Minister of Russia and Presidential Envoy to the Far Eastern Federal District since 2013. From 2004 to 2012, he served as Minister of Natural Resources and the Environment of Russia.

Political career

Local government 
Trutnev was elected mayor of Perm in 1996 (achieving 61.42% support in the first round) and governor of the Perm Oblast in 2000 (51.48%).

Federal government 
During his term as governor, Trutnev maintained a neutral stance towards the Kremlin administration.

In 2008 and 2009, Trutnev was officially named Russia's highest earning member of government. In April 2010, he reported an overall income of 155 million rubles ($5.34 million) for the past fiscal year, according to figures published by the government. President Dmitry Medvedev in 2008 obliged all government officials to publish their incomes and assets, in his drive to fight rampant corruption. However, the figures do not explain how money was earned.

On 31 August 2013 he was appointed Deputy Prime Minister of Russia and Presidential Envoy to the Far Eastern Federal District in the First Medvedev Cabinet. He was re-appointed to this office on 18 May 2018 with the Second Medvedev Cabinet, and again on 21 January 2020 with the Mishustin Cabinet.

Defence of seal clubs
Russia made headlines worldwide when, on 18 March 2010, it announced that it would ban the killing of seals less than a year old, effectively ending one of the biggest kills of harp seals in the world. Yury Trutnev called the seal slaughter "bloody", and remarked that the killing of defenceless animals can't be deemed a "hunt".

Sanctions 

References

External links
 Official site

1956 births
Living people
1st class Active State Councillors of the Russian Federation
Mayors of Perm
Governors of Perm Krai
Deputy heads of government of the Russian Federation
21st-century Russian politicians
Russian individuals subject to the U.S. Department of the Treasury sanctions